Multiply Records was a subsidiary of Telstar Records, that launched in 1993 and went into liquidation in 2004. Its major signings included Sash!, Phats & Small and the Cheeky Girls.

It was the brainchild of  Mike Hall, who already worked for the parent company Telstar.Early successes included signing Bassment Jaxx's "Flylife", TJR feat Xavier's "Just Gets Better", one of the garage scene's foremost hits, as well as Lil Mo Yin Yang's "Reach", and Junior Vasquez's "If Madonna Calls". As a label they balanced credible releases with commercial hits, and enjoyed considerable success, as well as providing content for Telstar's huge compilation business.

The label had three sub labels - Multiply White (active 1995–1996), Sum Records (active 1996–1998) and MP2 (active in 2001).

In 2014, a number of Multiply releases were released to iTunes and Spotify by Phoenix Music International. Additionally some releases by other Telstar dance subsidiaries such as Decode and Pukka were digitally released under the Multiply brand.

Releases

Singles

Multiply White singles

Sum Records singles

MP2 Records

Albums

See also
 List of record labels

References

British record labels
Record labels established in 1993
Record labels disestablished in 2004
Pop record labels
English electronic dance music record labels